Johan Erhard Areschoug (Johannes Erhard Areschoug, Philos. Doctor, Botanices et Oeconomiae) (16 September 1811 – 7 May 1887) was a Swedish botanist who was a native of Göteborg. He was a member of the Arreskow family (in Swedish). His first name is sometimes recorded as "John".

He studied natural sciences at the University of Lund, where in 1838 he earned his doctorate in philosophy. In 1859 he succeeded Elias Magnus Fries (1794-1878) as professor of botany at the University of Uppsala, a position he maintained until 1876. In 1851, he was elected a member of the Royal Swedish Academy of Sciences.

Areschoug performed extensive field studies of Scandinavian cryptogams, being remembered for his work in the field of phycology. The red algae genus Areschougia from the family Areschougiaceae is named in his honor.

Selected publications 
 Symbolae Algarum rar. Florae scandinavicae (1838).
 Iconographia phycologica (1847).
 Phyceae scanidnavicae marinae (1850).
 Observationes phycologicae (1883).

References

 Are Akademi Collegium Europaeum (biographical information)
 Svenskt Biografiskt Handlexikon (translated biography)

Botanists with author abbreviations
Swedish botanists
Swedish phycologists
1811 births
1887 deaths
Academic staff of Uppsala University
Members of the Royal Swedish Academy of Sciences
Scientists from Gothenburg